The 2020 United States presidential election in Illinois was held on Tuesday, November 3, 2020, as part of the 2020 United States presidential election in which all 50 states plus the District of Columbia participated. Illinois voters chose electors to represent them in the Electoral College via a popular vote, pitting the Republican Party's nominee, incumbent President Donald Trump of Florida, and his running mate, Vice President Mike Pence of Indiana, against Democratic Party nominee, former Vice President Joe Biden of Delaware, and his running mate, Senator Kamala Harris of California. Illinois has 20 votes in the Electoral College. Prior to the 2020 election, all news organizations predicted Illinois was a state that Biden would win, or otherwise considered a safe blue state.

Biden carried the Prairie State, winning 57.54% of the vote to Trump's 40.55%, winning by roughly the same 17-point margin by which Hillary Clinton carried the state in 2016. Libertarian nominee Jo Jorgensen, a native of Grayslake, won 1.1% of the state's vote, with other minor candidates winning less than 1%. Biden's win in Illinois was largely the result of a lopsided 74.3% victory in Cook County, the state's most populous county and the home of Chicago. Per exit polls by the Associated Press, Biden's strength came from a coalition of key Democratic constituencies: he garnered 92% of votes from Blacks; 68% from Latinos, including 67% of Latinos of Mexican heritage; 53% from union households; and 50% of Whites. Biden flipped McLean County (Bloomington-Normal) and Kendall County (in the Chicago metropolitan area), both of which had voted for Barack Obama in 2008, but then for Mitt Romney in 2012 and Trump in 2016. Biden became the first Democrat since Franklin D. Roosevelt in 1944 to be elected president without winning formerly Democratic leaning Alexander County, solidifying its rural shift towards Republicans in elections; he also became the first to do so without carrying Fulton, Henderson, Henry, Knox, Mercer, Putnam, Warren, or Whiteside counties since Jimmy Carter in 1976, as well as the first to do so without carrying Jo Daviess or Carroll counties since Bill Clinton in 1992 and 1996, respectively.

Illinois was one of five states in the nation in which Biden's victory margin was larger than 1 million raw votes, the others being California, Maryland, Massachusetts and New York.

Primary elections
Illinois held its primary elections as scheduled, despite concerns over the COVID-19 pandemic in the United States. Election officials in Illinois acknowledged that they believed turnout was unusually low.

In the state-run primaries (Democratic and Republican), turnout was 28.36%, with 2,279,439 votes cast. The 28.36% turnout marked an 18.2 percentage point decrease from the turnout in the 2016 state-run presidential primaries, but a similar turnout to the 2000, 2004, and 2012 presidential primaries.

The state-run primary elections for the Democratic and Republican parties were held on March 17, 2020. The Green Party had organized its own primary on March 14, 2020.

Democratic primary

The 2020 Illinois Democratic presidential primary was held on March 17, 2020, as one of the Democratic Party's state primaries ahead of the 2020 presidential election. Major candidates included Joe Biden and Senator Bernie Sanders of Vermont.

Republican primary

The 2020 Illinois Republican presidential primary was held on March 17, 2020, in the U.S. state of Illinois as one of the Republican Party's state primaries ahead of the 2020 presidential election.

Incumbent president Donald Trump won the primary with over 96 percent of the vote. Joe Walsh, a former member of the House of Representatives from Illinois, announced the launch of his campaign in August 2019 and dropped out in February 2020. Rocky De La Fuente, a businessman from California, also challenged Trump, achieving 4% of the vote. Richard Mayers, a 2016 Green Party candidate, was a write-in candidate here.

Green

The 2020 Illinois Green Party presidential primary was held from March 14, 2020, in the U.S. state of Illinois as one of the Green Party's state primaries ahead of the 2020 presidential election. It was run by the Green Party of Illinois.

General election

Predictions

Polling

Graphical summary

Aggregate polls

Polls

Results
The election was not close with Biden winning by a nearly 17-point margin. Biden only won 14 of the state's 102 counties; however, those 14 counties account for more than half the state's total electorate. Key to Biden's landslide victory was heavily populated Cook County, home of Chicago, which he won with over 74% of the vote. Biden also did well in the suburban (collar) counties of Chicago, winning all of them easily except for McHenry County. Biden also did well in St. Clair County, located in the St Louis metropolitan area. Biden also managed to flip two counties, Kendall County and McLean County. Biden also made history by earning the most votes ever cast in an Illinois presidential election. Biden received 3,471,915 votes. This is more than then-Senator Obama in 2008 when he received 3,419,348, but less than Senator Dick Durbin's 3,615,844 votes in the 2008 Senate race.

On December 14, Illinois's 20 electors met in the Illinois State Capitol to cast their votes for Biden and Harris formally.

By county

Counties that flipped from Republican to Democratic
McLean (largest municipality: Bloomington)
Kendall (largest municipality: Oswego)

By congressional district
Biden won 12 of the 18 congressional districts, Trump won 6 including one that elected a Democrat.

See also
 United States presidential elections in Illinois
 2020 Illinois elections
 Illinois Fair Tax (2020 ballot referendum)
 2020 United States elections
 2020 United States presidential election
 2020 Democratic Party presidential primaries
 2020 Republican Party presidential primaries

Notes

References

Further reading

External links
 
 
  (state affiliate of the U.S. League of Women Voters)
 

Illinois
2020
Presidential